Andrej Lanišek (born 13 October 1957) is a Slovenian biathlete. He competed in the 20 km individual event at the 1984 Winter Olympics.

References

External links
 

1957 births
Living people
Slovenian male biathletes
Olympic biathletes of Yugoslavia
Biathletes at the 1984 Winter Olympics
Sportspeople from Ljubljana